Lepley Nunatak is a small yet conspicuous rocky nunatak  southwest of Dendtler Island, near the inner part and eastern end of the Abbot Ice Shelf, Antarctica.

References

Nunataks of Ellsworth Land